Claire Burger is a French film director, film editor and screenwriter. She received the Camera d'Or award for her debut feature film Party Girl at the 2014 Cannes Film Festival.

Filmography

Director

Writer

References

External links
 

Living people
Year of birth missing (living people)
French film directors
French women film directors
French women screenwriters
French screenwriters
French film editors
French cinematographers
French women cinematographers
People from Forbach
French women film editors
Directors of Caméra d'Or winners